Minimum Wage Fixing Machinery (Agriculture) Convention, 1951 is  an International Labour Organization Convention.

It was established in 1951, with the preamble stating:
Having decided upon the adoption of certain proposals with regard to minimum wage fixing machinery in agriculture,...

The convention was followed up by Minimum Wage Fixing Convention, 1970.

Ratifications
As of July 2015, the convention had been ratified by 54 states. One ratifying state—the United Kingdom—has denounced the treaty.

External links 
Text.
Ratifications.

International Labour Organization conventions
Minimum wage law
Treaties concluded in 1951
Treaties entered into force in 1953
Agricultural treaties
Treaties of Algeria
Treaties of Australia
Treaties of Austria
Treaties of Belgium
Treaties of Belize
Treaties of Brazil
Treaties of Cameroon
Treaties of the Central African Republic
Treaties of Colombia
Treaties of the Comoros
Treaties of the Cook Islands
Treaties of Costa Rica
Treaties of Cuba
Treaties of Czechoslovakia
Treaties of the Czech Republic
Treaties of Ivory Coast
Treaties of Djibouti
Treaties of El Salvador
Treaties of the French Fourth Republic
Treaties of Grenada
Treaties of West Germany
Treaties of Guatemala
Treaties of Guinea
Treaties of the Hungarian People's Republic
Treaties of Ireland
Treaties of Italy
Treaties of Kenya
Treaties of Malawi
Treaties of Malta
Treaties of Mauritius
Treaties of Mexico
Treaties of Moldova
Treaties of Morocco
Treaties of the Netherlands
Treaties of New Zealand
Treaties of Papua New Guinea
Treaties of Paraguay
Treaties of Peru
Treaties of the Philippines
Treaties of the Polish People's Republic
Treaties of Senegal
Treaties of Seychelles
Treaties of Sierra Leone
Treaties of Slovakia
Treaties of Francoist Spain
Treaties of the Dominion of Ceylon
Treaties of Eswatini
Treaties of Syria
Treaties of Tunisia
Treaties of Turkey
Treaties of Uruguay
Treaties of Zambia
Treaties of Zimbabwe
Treaties of Gabon
Treaties extended to the Territory of Papua and New Guinea
Treaties extended to French Guiana
Treaties extended to Guadeloupe
Treaties extended to Martinique
Treaties extended to Réunion
Treaties extended to the Cook Islands
Treaties extended to Niue
Treaties extended to British Honduras
Treaties extended to the Gambia Colony and Protectorate
Treaties extended to British Grenada
Treaties extended to Guernsey
Treaties extended to Jersey
Treaties extended to the Federation of Rhodesia and Nyasaland
Treaties extended to the Isle of Man
Treaties extended to British Mauritius
Treaties extended to Saint Christopher-Nevis-Anguilla
Treaties extended to the Crown Colony of Seychelles
Treaties extended to the Colony of Sierra Leone
Treaties extended to the British Solomon Islands
1951 in labor relations